Carbohydrate (chondroitin 4) sulfotransferase 13 is a protein that is encoded in humans by the CHST13 gene.

Function 

The protein encoded by this gene belongs to the sulfotransferase 2 family. It is localized to the golgi membrane, and catalyzes the transfer of sulfate to the C4 hydroxyl of beta-1,4-linked N-acetylgalactosamine (GalNAc) flanked by glucuronic acid residue in chondroitin. Chondroitin sulfate constitutes the predominant proteoglycan present in cartilage and is distributed on the surfaces of many cells and extracellular matrices.

References

Further reading